Swami Satyamitranand (19 September 1932 – 25 June 2019), usually known as Swami Satmitranand Giri was a Hindu spiritual guru. He was born on 19 September 1932 in the city of Agra, Uttar Pradesh, India, as Ambika Prasad. He was crowned the Jagatguru Shankaracharya of an Upapeeth of Jyotir Math. He was the founder of Bharat Mata Mandir, a temple in Haridwar. He founded Samanvaya Seva Foundation in 1988.

In June 1969, Swamiji abdicated his status of Jagatguru Shankaracharya. He was awarded the Padma Bhushan by Government of India in the year 2015.

References

1932 births
2019 deaths
People from Agra
Indian Hindu monks
Indian Hindu missionaries
Recipients of the Padma Bhushan in other fields
Gurus
Shankaracharyas
People from Varanasi